Selišče is a small village between Kamno and Volarje in the Municipality of Tolmin in the Littoral region of Slovenia.

References

External links
Selišče on Geopedia

Populated places in the Municipality of Tolmin